Lee Sung-jong (Hangul: 이성종; hanja: 李成種; born September 3, 1993), commonly known as Sungjong or Lee Seong-jong, is a South Korean singer. He is a vocalist of the South Korean boy band Infinite under Woollim Entertainment. He is also the vocalist of Infinite F.

Personal life
Lee Sung-jong was born in Gwangju City, South Korea, on September 3, 1993. He moved to Andong when he was 9. He has a younger brother three years younger than him named Lee Seon-gyu. He graduated from Jeonju Arts High School on February 7, 2012, and was studying at Kongju University.

On July 29, 2019, he revealed on his Instagram that he had quietly enlisted for his mandatory military service. He enlisted on July 22 as a public service worker. His military service ended on May 8, 2021.

Career

Infinite

Sungjong was first introduced as a vocalist of the boy band Infinite in 2010. His first appearance as a member was during Infinite's pre-debut reality show You Are My Oppa. The group officially debuted on June 9, 2010.

Infinite F

Sungjong was announced as a member of Infinite F during the One Great Step Returns encore concert, along with Sungyeol and L. There, they performed the song "My Heart is Beating". The unit released their first song "I'm Going Crazy" in Infinite's 2nd album, "Season 2". On November 19, 2014, they made their official debut in Japan with their album, "Koi No Sign" and debuted in Korea with the single album, "Azure" on December 2, 2014.

Solo 
On January 24, 2022, it was announced that Sungjong's contract with Woollim Entertainment has expired after he decided not to renew it.

In September 2022, Sungjong signed with SPK Entertainment.

On October 30th, 2022, Sungjong held the 2022 Lee Seongjong HALLO-CON fan meeting 'WONDERLAND: HALLOWEEN'. Subsequently, he held his first solo fan meeting in Taiwan on November 18.

On February 24th, 2023, it was announced that Sungjong would be making his official solo debut with his 1st Single Album and single of the same name, 'The One' on March 13. Pre-orders for his 1st Single Album 'The One' were held starting on March 2nd, 2023.

Discography

Singles

Filmography

Television series

Television shows

Web shows

Radio shows

References

External links
 

1993 births
Living people
South Korean male idols
South Korean male singers
South Korean pop singers
Japanese-language singers of South Korea
South Korean male dancers
South Korean male voice actors
Infinite (group) members
People from Gwangju